Memories Unlocked is a Canadian drama film, directed by Jean Beaudin and released in 1999. Based on the novel Homme invisible à la fenêtre by Monique Proulx, the film stars James Hyndman as Max, a paraplegic artist whose ex-girlfriend Lucie (Pascale Bussières) returns several years after their breakup to accuse him of rape.

The film's cast also includes Pierre-Luc Brillant, Yves Jacques, Louise Portal, Michel Charette, Marcel Sabourin and Sébastien Huberdeau.

The film received four Genie Award nominations at the 20th Genie Awards: Best Adapted Screenplay (Beaudin, Proulx), Best Cinematography (Pierre Gill), Best Art Direction/Production Design (François Séguin) and Best Overall Sound (Serge Beauchemin, Bernard Gariépy Strobl and Hans Peter Strobl). It received five Prix Jutra nominations at the 2nd Jutra Awards, for Best Picture, Best Supporting Actor (Jacques), Best Cinematography (Gill), Best Sound (Serge Beauchemin, Louis Dupire, Hans Peter Strobl and Jo Caron) and Best Original Music (Richard Grégoire). Gill won the Jutra for cinematography.

References

External links 
 

1999 films
Canadian drama films
Films set in Quebec
Films shot in Quebec
Films directed by Jean Beaudin
Films based on Canadian novels
French-language Canadian films
1990s Canadian films